Theatre Annual: A Journal of Performance Studies is an annual peer-reviewed academic journal that covers the history and ethnography of performance. It was established in 1942 by the Theatre Library Association and initially edited by John Falconeiri and published by the John Cabot International University and Hiram College in Ohio. It was then moved to Akron University and was edited by Wallace Sterling. It is now published in the fall of each year by the College of William & Mary in Virginia.

Abstracting and indexing 

The journal is abstracted and indexed in the International Bibliography of Theatre & Dance,  Humanities Index, Humanities International Index, International Bibliography of Periodical Literature, and MLA International Bibliography.

References

External links 
 

College of William & Mary
Annual journals
English-language journals
Publications established in 1942
1942 establishments in Ohio
Hiram College
University of Akron